is a city located in Nagano Prefecture, Japan. , the city had an estimated population of 59,381 in 22,018 households, and a population density of 500 persons per km².

Geography
Chikuma is located in the Chikuma River valley, south of Nagano city, at the junction of the Joshin-etsu Expressway and the Nagano Expressway.

Climate
The city has a climate characterized by hot and humid summers, and relatively mild winters (Köppen climate classification Cfa).  The average annual temperature in Chikuma is 12.7 °C. The average annual rainfall is 1140 mm with September as the wettest month. The temperatures are highest on average in August, at around 26.2 °C, and lowest in January, at around 0 °C.

Surrounding municipalities
Nagano Prefecture
 Nagano
 Ueda
 Omi
 Chikuhoku
 Sakaki

Demographics
Per Japanese census data, the population of Chikuma peaked around the year 2000 and has declined slightly since.

History
The area of present-day Chikuma was part of ancient Shinano Province and has been settled since prehistoric times. There are numerous burial tumuli in the city, including the Mori Shogunzukakofun, a mountaintop keyhole-shaped tomb dating from near the end of the Kofun period, which is one of the latest of its type in eastern Japan. During the Nara period, the area around the Shinano River was the settling for numerous poems in the Man'yōshū. The area was part of the holdings of Matsushiro Domain during the Edo period, and also prospered from a series of post stations on the pilgrimage route to the famed Zenkō-ji temple. The modern city of Chikuma was founded on September 1, 2003 by the merger of the former city of Koshoku, the town of Kamiyamada (from Sarashina District), and the town of Togura (from Hanishina District).

Government
Chikuma has a mayor-council form of government with a directly elected mayor and a unicameral city legislature of 24 members.

Economy
Chikuma is known for its production of knitted goods, food processing and light machinery manufacturing. Horticulture, especially that of apricots forms an important sector of the local economy.

Education
Chikuma has nine public elementary schools and four public middle schools. The city has one public high school operated by the Nagano Prefectural Board of Education, and one combined public middle/high school. The prefecture  also operates one special education school.

Transportation

Railway
 East Japan Railway Company - Shinonoi Line

  Shinano Railway - Shinano Railway Line
 -  -  -

Highway
 Nagano Expressway 
 Jōshin-etsu Expressway

Local attractions
 Anzu no Sato (あんずの里), or "Apricot Village", a collection of adjacent valleys containing numerous groves of apricot trees.  
  (戸倉上山田温泉), a popular hot spring area.
The  are a Designated Cultural Landscape of Japan.

Former city of Koshoku
 (更埴) is the largest of the three municipalities that were joined to form the current Chikuma city.  Spanning the Chikuma River and bordering Nagano city to the south, it entends from the apricot fields of Anzu no Sato in the east to the highland area Hijiri Kogen in the west. Koshoku's history dates back to the Kofun Period, and several major archaeological sites remain.  Later, in the Meiji Period, the inns located in Inariyama became a popular stopover for pilgrims en route to Zenkō-ji.

Former town of Kamiyamada
 (上山田) lies on the western bank of the Chikuma River, just north of the town of Sakaki. A popular hot spring village dating back to the 19th century, the town was one of many places of lodging on the pilgrimage route to Zenkō-ji.

Former town of Togura
 (戸倉) lies on the east bank of the Chikuma River, across from Kamiyamada Onsen.  With a history similar to that of Kamiyamada, it contains some hot spring bath facilities as well as the area's only railway station.

Notable people from Chikuma
 Junichi Kakizaki, floral artist
 Atsushi Kitagawara, architect
 Abdullah Kobayashi, professional wrestler
 Anri Kumaki, pop singer-songwriter 
 Tatsumi Yoda, entertainment businessman
 Tatsumi Yoda, entertainment businessman
 Tyler Lynch, hotelier and media favorite

References

External links

Official Website 

 
Cities in Nagano Prefecture
Cultural Landscapes of Japan